The Invercauld was an 1,100-ton sailing vessel that was wrecked on the Auckland Islands in 1864.

Wreck 
The Invercauld was under the command of Captain George Dalgarno and was bound from Melbourne to Callao in ballast with a total of 25 crew. She struck the Auckland Islands at 2 a.m. on 11 May 1864, broke up and was totally destroyed in a short amount of time. The crew all struggled towards a small cove nearby, and 19 of the 25 crew managed to get ashore. Crew members Middleton and Wilson and four others drowned. All of the rest were hurt in some way and had no shoes. The survivors spent the night onshore and then at daybreak investigated the scene of the wreck and came away with only some few pounds of ships biscuits and salted pork. They found the bodies of the drowned crew and stripped them of their clothing but were unable to bury them.

The crew had enough timber to build a rough hut and, as one of the crew had matches, a fire was able to be lit. After four days of inactivity there were no remaining provisions and three men climbed the cliffs in search of food. Eventually the entire group of survivors, save one ill man and a caretaker, climbed the cliffs. The original group of three had caught a pig, which they brought back to the group. The smell of the roasting pig lured the caretaker, who left the gravely ill man to die alone on the beach. At the top of the cliffs they found fresh water and some roots. The weather was very cold with frost and snow on the ground. They spent the night and then pushed on towards Port Ross, a journey that took several days due to the thickness of the scrub. They managed to hunt a single pig for food and continued to travel, losing another man to cold and hunger. They arrived on the other side of the island and set up a shelter but for 21 days had nothing to eat except roots and water. Seven men decided to return to the wreck and the group saw nothing more of them.

Andrew Smith and four others left the remaining five crew to search for the beach through thick bush. They were able to get to the beach and harvest shellfish and sent a man back to fetch the others only to find that another two had died. The group reunited and the eight men stayed on the beach for about a week. A group of five continued to explore and reached Port Ross, where they found the traces of the abandoned Enderby Settlement and huts. One man again went back for the others. By this time the group was getting very weak and lost a further two men leaving Captain Dalgarno, the Mate Andrew Smith, the Carpenter Alex Henderson and three seamen Robert Holding, George Liddle and James Lancefield at Port Ross.

After three or four months the supply of shellfish was exhausted and seals were rarely seen or captured. The group, now down to three surviving members, constructed a canoe from seal skins and tree branches and waited for fine weather to cross to Rose Island. Here they found rabbits and they also built a sod cabin with a thatched roof. Henderson, Liddle and Lancefield died before this time and were buried in the sand.

On 20 May 1865, the Portuguese ship Julian entered the harbour. The ship had sprung a leak and sent a boat to shore in the hopes of obtaining repairs. The three survivors were taken aboard the Julian and safely transported to Callao. The Julian didn't search for other castaways – possibly because the ship was taking on water and needed to get to harbor for repairs.

Coinciding with the wreck of the Grafton 

The wreck of the Invercauld occurred four months after the wreck of the Grafton. Both vessels had survivors on Auckland Island at the same time but at different ends of it. The two groups of survivors were unaware of each other's existence until the Flying Scud visited to pick up the last two of the Grafton castaways. Smoke from a fire was spotted but not investigated. When the Flying Scud visited Erebus Cove the crew found the body of a man lying beside the ruins of a house. The man had been dead for some time. The house was one of the Enderby Settlement buildings and the corpse was the 2nd mate of the Invercauld, James Mahoney. One foot was bound with woollen rags. Mahoney, who had an injured leg, had starved after being abandoned by the captain.

The differences in the two castaway groups' survival rates are many and varied, with leadership being a prominent issue. The Grafton group, led by Captain Thomas Musgrave, were better resourced and much better organised. They retrieved larger stocks of food, a dinghy with which to travel around the coast, a gun to shoot birds and also had a wreck from which to salvage useful material. When their ship wrecked in the dark, rather than abandoning ship immediately, they bravely waited till morning when one sailor swam to shore carrying a rope. Consequently, they were able to save not only their critically ill shipmate, François Édouard Raynal, but a limited assortment of supplies. The compassion they showed to Raynal typified their treatment of each other for the rest of their 600-day ordeal.

In contrast, when the Invercauld wrecked after nearly 3 hours of distress, there was no preparation, no call to abandon ship, the ship's three small boats weren't launched, the Captain and officers were shouting impossible and contradictory orders, and a sick young crewman was left on board to drown. The Invercauld group arrived with nothing more than the clothes on their backs, and two damp boxes of matches which happened to be in someone's pockets. After lighting a fire, they accidentally set fire to both boxes while trying to dry the matches.

Both groups had their share of good luck: The Grafton wrecked at the end of the island with more seals, but the Invercauld crew soon stumbled on the remains of a deserted settlement with partial houses, tools, metal and timber. The major reasons the Grafton five all survived, despite a much longer period as castaways, were their utilisation of opportunity, their planning, their ingenuity, and their dedication to the survival of the entire group. The Invercauld crew, right from the time of the shipwreck, was dominated by an ethos of every man for himself. Individual crewmen, such as the cook, were abandoned to die just a few hundred yards from the rest of the group. Food wasn't shared equitably, violence was commonplace, and the Captain was primarily interested in his own survival. Eventually, when just three of the crew remained alive, they had the good luck of being spotted by a ship which had sailed in to repair a leak.

Meanwhile, the Grafton five were still trapped to the south. Suspecting they would need to save themselves, they set about building a boat to sail to New Zealand. First they needed tools, so they built a forge, a bellows, a charcoal pit for fuel and proceeded to manufacture over a dozen tools and 700 nails. Even when the boat proved impossible to build (due to the lack of suitable timber and a large drill bit) they adapted their plan and rebuilt their tiny, three man dinghy. During this long difficult period, the men solved any personal issues quickly and effectively so morale stayed high. When Musgrave, Raynal and another crewman reached New Zealand, Musgrave was soon persuaded to return to the Auckland Islands to help rescue the two crew who had been forced to remain behind.

Cannibalism 
At least one man from the Invercauld resorted to cannibalism. Robert Holding, one of only three survivors, reported that two men (Fred "Fritz" Hawser and William Hervey, known as "Harvey") got into an altercation late one night. Harvey admitted to throwing Fritz out of their primitive stick shelter, because he was being a "nuisance". Fritz hit the ground face first, and was found dead in that position the next morning. Several days later Holding discovered "Harvey had been eating some of Fritz." Sixty years later Holding wrote that this horrible episode was still burned into his memory.

Crew list 
The list of the crew at the time of the wreck was:

 George Dalgarno (Captain) (survived)
 Andrew Smith (Chief Mate) (survived)
 Alex. Henderson of Aberdeen (carpenter)
 Richard Peenbo
 W. Bonner
 Juan Lagos
 William Goble
 W. Cowan
 Jacob T. Turner
 John Peterson
 James Lancefield of Aberdeen
 John Wilson of Aberdeen (drowned)
 William Middleton of Aberdeen (drowned)
 George Liddle of Aberdeen
 John Maloney
 Robert Holding (Seaman) (survived)
 W. Hipwell
 John W. Tait
 Thomas Page
 William Hervey
 James Southerland
 John Teasen
 Aug. Bruns
 Fritz Hawser
 A. Burns

References

External links 
 Island of the Lost: Shipwrecked At the Edge of the World (Archive.org mirror of deleted page on official site for Joan Druett's 2007 account of the Grafton and Invercauld wrecks)

1864 in Antarctica
1864 in New Zealand
Maritime incidents in May 1864
Shipwrecks of the Auckland Islands